Conor McMenamin (born 24 August 1995) is a professional footballer who plays for Glentoran in the NIFL Premiership and the Northern Ireland national side.

Club career
McMenamin began his career at Linfield, before moving to Glentoran in 2015. He spent one season at Glentoran before joining Warrenpoint Town.

In 2018, he joined Cliftonville. On 26 December 2019, he scored both goals in a 2–1 North Belfast Derby win over Crusaders at Seaview. In January 2021, McMenamin returned to Glentoran.

International career
McMenamin made his international debut for Northern Ireland on 5 June 2022 against Cyprus in the UEFA Nations League.

Honours
Linfield
County Antrim Shield: 2013–14

Glentoran
NIFL Charity Shield: 2015–16

Warrenpoint Town
NIFL Championship: 2016–17

Cliftonville
County Antrim Shield: 2019–20

References

External links
 

1995 births
Living people
People from Downpatrick
Association footballers from Northern Ireland
Association football forwards
Cliftonville F.C. players
Glentoran F.C. players
Linfield F.C. players
NIFL Premiership players
Warrenpoint Town F.C. players
Northern Ireland international footballers